Soalala is a district in western Madagascar. It is a part of Boeny Region and borders the districts of Mitsinjo in northeast, Ambato-Boeni in east, Kandreho in south and Besalampy in west.

There had been several victimes of Cyclone Belna that fell land on  09.12.2019 in Soalala

Communes
The district is further divided into three communes:

 Ambohipaky
 Andranomavo
 Soalala

Economy
 Soalala mine - which contains iron ore
 Marine shrimp farming
 Baie de Baly National Park
 Namoroka National Park is situated in the Soalala District.

Infra structures
 Soalala Airport
 Thermal power station of 60 kw.
 Two additional hydraulic power stations are planned to take up operations in 2021.

References and notes

Districts of Boeny